Equestrian at the 1984 Summer Paralympics consisted of twelve events. All events were mixed, meaning that men and women competed together.

Equestrian had a combined class for spinal cord injuries and Les Autres at the 1984 Summer Paralympics, with the competition being held in Texas.  There were 16 total competitors, with three having spinal cord injuries, two having multiple sclerosis, two with other neurological impairments, and nine others.

Medal summary

References 

 

 
1984 Summer Paralympics events
1984
1984 in equestrian
Para Dressage